David Bernie (born 1947) is an Irish retired hurling selector and former player who enjoyed a successful career as a midfielder with the Wexford senior team.

Born in Ferns, County Wexford, Bernie was introduced to hurling in his youth. He was an All-Ireland runner-up at colleges level with St. Peter's College while simultaneously coming to prominence with the Ferns St. Aidan's club.

Bernie made his senior debut during the 1968 championship. He went on to play a key role for Wexford at midfield during a successful era, and won one All-Ireland medal, three Leinster medals and one National Hurling League medal. He was an All-Ireland runner-up on two occasions.

As a member of the Leinster inter-provincial team, Benrie won one Railway Cup medal. Throughout his inter-county career he made 18 championship appearances. Bernie retired from inter-county hurling following the conclusion of the 1978 championship.

In retirement from playing Bernie became involved in team management and coaching. He was a selector with the Wexford senior team under the managerial reign of Christy Keogh.

Playing career

Inter-county

Bernie broke onto the Wexford senior team in 1968. He won his first Leinster medal that year following a 3–13 to 4–9 defeat of reigning provincial and All-Ireland champions Kilkenny. This victory allowed Wexford to advance to an All-Ireland final against Tipperary, the outstanding team of the decade, on 1 September 1968. All was going to plan for Tipperary as they took a 1–11 to 1–3 lead at half-time. In one of the great All-Ireland comebacks, Tony Doran got Wexford back on track with a goal six minutes after the interval. Three more goals followed from Paul Lynch, Jack Berry and Doran again. Late goals from Michael "Babs" Keating and Seán McLoughlin for Tipperary failed to stem the tide as Wexford secured a remarkable 5–8 to 3–12 victory. It was Bernie's sole All-Ireland medal.

After surrendering their championship titles in 1969, Wexford regrouped the following year. A 4–16 to 3–14 defeat of old rivals Kilkenny in the very first 80-minute championship game gave Benrie a second Leinster medal. Wexford subsequently faced Cork in the All-Ireland decider on 6 September 1970. A record 64-point scoreline and eleven goals were produced in a sometimes ill-tempered and disappointing contest. Tony Doran top scored for Wexford with two goals, however, the day belonged to Eddie O'Brien who scored a hat-trick of goals for Cork from his hand. A remarkable 6–21 to 5–10 score line gave Cork the victory.

Benrie won a National Hurling League medal in 1973 following a 4–13 to 3–7 defeat of Limerick.

After being dropped from the Wexford team in 1976, Bernie was back the following year and collected his third Leinster medal following a 3–17 to 3–14 defeat of Kilkenny. The All-Ireland final on 4 September 1977 was a repeat of the previous year, with Cork providing the opposition once again. Seánie O'Leary scored the decisive goal for Cork as the game entered the last quarter, while Martin Coleman brought off a match-winning save from Christy Keogh to foil the Wexford comeback. A 1–17 to 3–8 defeat was Bernie's lot.

Bernie retired from inter-county hurling following Wexford's exit from the 1978 championship.

Inter-provincial

Bernie was chosen at midfield on the Leinster inter-provincial team in 1978. A 2–17 to 2–12 defeat of rivals Munster secured his sole Railway Cup triumph.

Honours

Team

Wexford
All-Ireland Senior Hurling Championship (1): 1968
Leinster Senior Hurling Championship (3): 1968, 1970, 1977
National Hurling League (1): 1972–73

Leinster
Railway Cup (1): 1971

References

1948 births
Living people
All-Ireland Senior Hurling Championship winners
Leinster inter-provincial hurlers
People from Ferns
St Aidan's hurlers
Wexford inter-county hurlers
People educated at St Peter's College, Wexford